The East Asia Summit (EAS) is a regional forum held annually by leaders of, initially, 16 countries in the East Asian, Southeast Asian, South Asian and Oceanian regions, based on the ASEAN Plus Six mechanism. Membership expanded to 18 countries including Russia and the United States at the Sixth EAS in 2011. Since its establishment, ASEAN has held the central role and leadership in the forum. EAS meetings are held after the annual ASEAN leaders' meetings, and plays an important role in the regional architecture of Asia-Pacific. The first summit was held in Kuala Lumpur, Malaysia on 14 December 2005.

History

History prior to the first East Asia Summit 
The concept of an East Asia Grouping has significant history going back to an idea first promoted in 1991 by then Malaysian Prime Minister Mahathir Mohamad.

The final report in 2002 of the East Asian Study Group, established by the ASEAN Plus Three countries, was based on an EAS involving ASEAN Plus Three, therefore not involving Australia, New Zealand, or India. The EAS as proposed was to be an ASEAN-led development, with the summit to be linked to ASEAN summit meetings. However, the issue was to which countries beyond those in ASEAN the EAS was to be extended.

The decision to hold the EAS was reached during the 2004 ASEAN Plus Three summit and the initial 16 members determined at the ASEAN Plus Three Ministerial Meeting held in Laos at the end of July 2005.

Credit for advancing the forum during the 2004 ASEAN Plus Three summit has been attributed to Malaysia.

Annual summits

Early summits

Prior to the first meeting there was significant discussion as to which countries should be represented. At the time there were difficulties in the relationship between the "Plus Three" members (i.e. Japan, China and South Korea) of ASEAN Plus Three, and the perception that India and Australia and to a lesser extent New Zealand were present to balance the growing China power all meant the first meeting's achievements were limited.  Russia expressed early interest in EAS membership and attended the first EAS as an observer at the invitation of 2005 EAS host Malaysia.

The next EAS was to be held on 13 December 2006 in Metro Cebu, Philippines.  After the confidence building of the inaugural EAS the 2006 EAS will help to define the future role of the EAS, its relationship with ASEAN Plus Three and the involvement of Russia in EAS.  However, in the face of Tropical Typhoon Utor the summit was postponed until January 2007. It was rescheduled for 15 January 2007, approximately a month after the original scheduled date.

Internal issues

Internal ASEAN issues were significant for the next Summits.  The issues of Myanmar (Burma), following the 2007 Burmese anti-government protests, and climate change were expected to be discussed at the Third EAS.  Myanmar successfully blocked formal discussion of its internal affairs.

The summit did issue the Singapore Declaration on Climate Change, Energy and the Environment.

The Summit also agreed to the establishment of the Economic Research Institute for ASEAN and East Asia and to receive the final report on the Comprehensive Economic Partnership for East Asia at the Fourth EAS.

The outcomes are summarised in the Chairman's Statement of the 3rd East Asia Summit Singapore, 21 November 2007. 

The Fourth EAS was significantly delayed and its location changed a number of times due to internal tensions in Thailand, the host nation. In the lead up to the summit there were several border clashes between Thailand and Cambodia. The summit however is said to be used as an opportunity for discussions on the sidelines between the respective nation's leaders. The summit was cancelled following protesters taking over the summit's venue on the day of the summit. It was rescheduled and held on 25 October 2009. The summit adopted statements on disaster relief and the Nalanda University.

Growth of the Summit

After a period of review, the Summit grew from 16 to 18 nations by adding the United States and Russia to the Summit.  Initially represented by their Foreign Ministers at the Fifth EAS, the two new members were invited to formally join with the Sixth EAS.  Tensions between the members of the Summit continued to impede the members developing a more ambitious program.

Member nations

Energy
At the Second EAS the EAS members signed the Cebu Declaration on East Asian Energy Security, a declaration on energy security and biofuels, containing a statement for members to prepare non-binding targets.

Trade and the Comprehensive Economic Partnership in East Asia (CEPEA)
Trade is an important focus for the summit.

As to trade and regional integration the following was noted in the Chair's report for the Second EAS:

12. We welcomed ASEAN's efforts towards further integration and community building, and reaffirmed our resolve to work closely together in narrowing development gaps in our region. We reiterated our support for ASEAN's role as the driving force for economic integration in this region. To deepen integration, we agreed to launch a Track To study on a Comprehensive Economic Partnership for East Asia (CEPEA) among EAS participants. We tasked the ASEAN Secretariat to prepare a time frame for the study and to invite all our countries to nominate their respective participants in it.

We welcomed Japan's proposal for an Economic Research Institute for ASEAN and East Asia (ERIA).

The reality appears however that movement towards such a relationship is a long way-off.  Lee Kuan Yew has compared the relationship between Southeast Asia and India with that of the European Community and Turkey, and has suggested that a free-trade area involving Southeast Asia and India is 30 to 50 years away.

The members of EAS agreed to study the Japanese proposed Comprehensive Economic Partnership in East Asia (CEPEA).  The Track Two report on CEPEA is due to be completed in mid-2008 and at the Third EAS it was agreed this would be considered at the Fourth EAS.

As noted above the Second EAS welcomed the Economic Research Institute for ASEAN and East Asia (ERIA).  It was subsequently announced that the ERIA would be established in November 2007 and confirmed at the Third EAS.

The Declaration of the Fifth Anniversary of the East Asia Summit issued at the Fifth EAS provided the Summit declared:

3. To redouble efforts to move progress and cooperation in the EAS further forward, including in the priority areas and in the promotion of regional integration through supporting the realisation of the ASEAN Community and such initiatives as the ASEAN Plus FTAs and other existing wider regional economic integration efforts including studies on East Asia Free Trade Area (EAFTA) and Comprehensive Economic Partnership in East Asia (CEPEA).

India has launched several Look-East connectivity projects with China and ASEAN nations.

East Asian Community

After the EAS was established the issue arose of whether any future East Asia Community would arise from the EAS or ASEAN Plus Three.  Prior to the creation of the EAS it appeared that ASEAN Plus Three would take the role of community building in East Asia.

Malaysia felt that it was still the case that the role of the community building fell to ASEAN Plus Three shortly before the second EAS despite "confusion". China apparently agreed whereas Japan and India felt the EAS should be the focus of the East Asian Community.

After the first EAS the feasibility of EAS to have a community building role was questioned with Ong Keng Yong, the secretary-general of ASEAN being quoted as describing the EAS as little more than a "brainstorming forum".
Nevertheless, the Chairman’s Press Statement for the Seventh ASEAN Plus Three Foreign Ministers’ Meeting Kuala Lumpur, 26 July 2006 said

25. The Ministers welcomed the convening of the East Asia Summit as a forum for dialogue on broad strategic, political and economic issues of common interest with the aim of promoting peace, stability and economic prosperity in East Asia. In this respect, they recognized that the East Asia Summit could make a significant contribution to the achievement of the long-term goal of establishing an East Asian community.

It appeared that over time following the first EAS the focus was less on whether the EAS has a role in community building to what the role and whether it was secondary to ASEAN Plus Three.  By mid-2006 the Chinese news site Xinhua Net suggested the community would arise through a two-phase process with ASEAN Plus Three as the first phase and the EAS as the second phase. The China-India joint declaration of 21 November 2006 linked, at paragraph 43, the EAS with the East Asian Community process.

The concentric circle model of the community process with ASEAN at the centre, ASEAN Plus Three at the next band and the East Asia Summit at the outer band is supported by the  Second Joint Statement on East Asia Cooperation Building on the Foundations of ASEAN Plus Three Cooperation which said:

III.  Looking Forward to a Decade of Consolidation and Closer Integration (2007–2017)

A. Defining the Objectives and Roles of the ASEAN Plus Three Cooperation in the Emerging Regional Architecture

1. We reaffirmed that the ASEAN Plus Three Process would remain as the main vehicle towards the long-term goal of building an East Asian community, with ASEAN as the driving force.

...  

3. We recognised and supported the mutually reinforcing and complementary roles of the ASEAN Plus Three process and such regional fora as EAS, ARF, APEC and ASEM to promote East Asian community building.

4. We reiterated that East Asian integration is an open, transparent, inclusive, and forward-looking process for mutual benefits and support internationally shared values to achieve peace, stability, democracy and prosperity in the region. Guided by the vision for durable peace and shared prosperity in East Asia and beyond, we will stand guided by new economic flows, evolving strategic interactions and the belief to continue to engage all interested countries and organisations towards the realisation of an open regional architecture capable of adapting to changes and new dynamism.

On any view, community building is not a short-term project.  However, after the second EAS, the Indian Prime Minister Manmohan Singh was confident that the EAS would lead to an East Asia Community. China had also apparently accepted this was the case.

If achieved the Comprehensive Economic Partnership for East Asia (CEPEA) would be a tangible first step in the community building process.  The second EAS seems to have increased confidence in CEPEA but is still only a proposal.

It has been suggested that as the EAS consists of an "anti-region" the prospects of it forming a community are less than likely.

Relationship with ASEAN Plus Three
The relationship between the EAS on one hand and ASEAN Plus Three on the other is still not clear. As discussed above, some countries are more supportive of the narrower ASEAN Plus Three grouping whereas others support the broader, more inclusive EAS. ASEAN Plus Three, which has been meeting since December 1997 has a history, including the Chiang Mai Initiative which appears to have led to the development of the Asian Monetary Unit.  This may be significant for those advocating a broader role for EAS in the future.

The tension between the groupings extends to the respective members' intentions towards future Free Trade Agreements with China and South Korea focused on ASEAN Plus Three and Japan on the broader EAS members.

The 1997 Asian financial crisis had demonstrated the need for regional groupings and initiatives.  It was during this time ASEAN Plus Three had commenced and it was also during this time that the East Asian caucus was being discussed.

The EAS is just one regional grouping and some members down play its significance, the former Australian Prime Minister John Howard has stated that the EAS was secondary as a regional summit to APEC which has on his view a premier role. Not all members of the EAS, notably India, are members of APEC.  However, as the EAS meetings are scheduled with the ASEAN Plus Three meetings (they both follow the annual ASEAN meetings) and all members of ASEAN Plus Three are members of EAS the ability of the two forums to remain relevant given the existence of the other remains in question.  China has stated its preference for both EAS and ASEAN Plus Three to exist side by side.

The relationship between APEC, ASEAN Plus Three and the EAS remained unresolved heading into the 2007 APEC meeting. Following the meeting the then Malaysian Prime Minister Abdullah Ahmad Badawi described ASEAN Plus Three as the primary vehicle and implied APEC was the lesser of the three. At the same time a Malaysian commentator writing in a Singaporean newspaper described concentric circles for the three with ASEAN Plus Three at the centre and APEC at the outer, also suggested the Nikai Initiative, with its regional OECD like plans, might overtaking the remaining role for APEC.

Countries joining the Summit process

Russia 
Russia participated in the first EAS as an observer at the invitation of 2005 host Malaysia and requested to become a member.  Its request to become a future member received support from China and India.

The membership of EAS was to be considered by ASEAN on a case-by-case basis. ASEAN decided to freeze new "membership" of EAS for the second and third summits.

The status of potential future members was discussed in the Chairman's Statement of the 16th ASEAN Summit (9 April 2010) in these terms:

43.    We recognized and supported the mutually reinforcing roles of the ASEAN+3 process, the East Asia Summit (EAS), and such regional forums as the ASEAN Regional Forum (ARF), to promote the East Asian cooperation and dialogue towards the building of a community in East Asia. In this connection, we encouraged Russia and the US to deepen their engagement in an evolving regional architecture, including the possibility of their involvement with the EAS through appropriate modalities, taking into account the Leaders-led, open and inclusive nature of the EAS.

ASEAN formally invited the United States and Russia to join the group from 2011.

United States 
Japan and India supported inclusion of the United States and Russia prior to their invitation to join the East Asia Summit.

US President Barack Obama declared his country "an Asia Pacific nation" during his first year in office. Subsequently, US Secretary of State Hillary Clinton attended the Fifth EAS in October 2010 and President Obama attended the Sixth EAS in November 2011.

ASEAN + 8 
In April and May 2010 it was discussed that the roles for Russia and the United States may be to create a new grouping "ASEAN + 8" including the East Asia Summit members together with the United States and Russia.  ASEAN + 8 may not meet as regularly as the East Asia Summit due to the logistical difficulties in the United States President committing to an annual Asian meeting.  Such a meeting could be held every two to three years to coincide with the APEC meeting occurring in Asia.

Potential future members

East Timor and Papua New Guinea 
East Timor is a candidate ASEAN member seeking membership within five years (from 2006) and Papua New Guinea has shown intention to join; presumably new members of ASEAN would also join the EAS.

Other countries and groupings 
Over several years, especially shortly the commencement of the summits, other countries have been connected with the EAS.

In 2006, Pakistan and Mongolia were proposed as future members by Malaysia. Mongolia was mentioned again by Vietnam, the then chair, in 2010.

In 2007, Pakistan and Bangladesh were raised by Japan as possible members.

In 2007, the European Union indicated it wishes to have a role as an observer.

In 2008, the Arab League held talks and expressed its desire to have a role as an observer.

In 2017, Sri Lanka and Maldives were proposed to be possible members of East Asia Summit. Prime Minister of Canada Justin Trudeau attended as guest. He had arrived directly from the APEC 2017 summit held in Da Nang, Vietnam.

See also
 Comprehensive Economic Partnership for East Asia
 Regional Comprehensive Economic Partnership
 Greater East Asia Co-Prosperity Sphere: unrelated concept in the mid-20th century
 Asian Monetary Unit
 ASEAN
 ASEAN Free Trade Area: The FTA arrangements between the 10 members of ASEAN
 ASEAN Summit: held jointly with the EAS

References

External links

 ASEAN-Australia Development Cooperation Program: About the East Asia Summit
 The East Asia Summit: Issues and outcomes
 The Council on East Asian Community
 East Asia New Multilateralism Hopes

21st-century diplomatic conferences (Asia-Pacific)
ASEAN meetings
Organizations associated with ASEAN
Organizations established in 2005
Politics of East Asia